is an application which comes pre-loaded on all Nintendo 3DS systems. In the game, players can meet other players' Miis over StreetPass and online through Nintendo Network, and interact with them.

Summary
StreetPass Mii Plaza is an application that makes use of the Nintendo 3DS's StreetPass functionality, in which the system can detect and exchange data with other nearby systems whilst in sleep mode. The game revolves around a player's chosen Mii, which can be customised with accessories earned from minigames, along with a short customizable message and some optional information about likes. When new Miis are registered by the system, they will appear at the gate. Up to ten Miis can show up at the gate at any one time, after which the player will need to use them with their minigames before checking for more. Meeting the same Miis multiple times adds extra functionality, such as personalised messages and the ability to rate them. There are also special Miis that appear via SpotPass during special events, such as Nintendo staff members. After meeting another player's Mii, the player can then use that Mii to play a variety of different games, three of them being playable free of charge: Puzzle Swap, StreetPass Quest, and StreetPass Quest II.

After the December 2011 update (2.0), extra features were added to the game including a map in which players can see which countries they have met the most Miis from (not all countries have this feature) and a music player which features unlockable tracks of music from the game and an accomplishments section. Another update was added in June 2013, introducing four new purchasable games, as well as a new interface and framerate improvements. Following this update, players can earn Plaza Tickets from purchasable games which can be exchanged for hats and outfits to customise their Mii. A second update, which adds two more purchasable games and additional features, was released in April 2015. A third update, which adds five more purchasable games and increases the capacity of StreetPass hits per session to 100, was implemented in September 2016.

Preloaded games

Puzzle Swap
 is a game in which players aim to complete a 3D animated picture of a Nintendo video game by gathering its pieces. If a player encountered on StreetPass possesses any pieces the player does not have, the player can choose one of their pieces to add to their own. The player may also use Play Coins to buy random pieces for their existing panels, although it won't always be a new piece. After the December 2011 update, new puzzles became available which included four or eight pink squares in the center. Pink pieces are distributed to players via SpotPass and can only be gathered via StreetPass; they cannot be bought using Play Coins. Some puzzles have more pieces than others, making them harder to complete.

StreetPass Quest / Find Mii
, known in North America as Find Mii, is a role-playing game. In this game, the player's Mii has been captured and it is up to the player to save him/her by battling their way through a series of rooms containing different enemies. Players use the Miis they have encountered, but can also use Play Coins to summon additional wanderers. Each Mii has a standard attack and a magic spell based on their color. For example, red Miis can cast flame spells whilst light blue Miis can freeze their opponents. Certain colored Miis are required to clear certain rooms, such as using a yellow Mii to break an enemy's yellow shield. If a Mii is encountered on StreetPass several times, their level in StreetPass Quest will increase, making them stronger, but only up to level 7. As the player progresses through the game, they can earn hats for their Mii to wear.

StreetPass Quest II / Find Mii II became available in December 2011 for players who had played through the first game at least twice. The sequel includes tougher enemies, multiple paths, and new hats. In addition to wanderers, players can now use Play Coins to hire up to three previously encountered Miis. In battle, similarly colored Miis can form teams to perform stronger combo attacks and spells. Play Coins can also be spent to use potions for various uses, such as clearing a room of gas. There is also a third secret quest that adds more difficulty to the StreetPass Quest II / Find Mii II maps that provides an additional set of hats that the player can win.

A stage based on Streetpass Quest / Find Mii appears in Super Smash Bros. for Nintendo 3DS. Two themes called Dark Lord and Save the World, Heroes!, which are music from Find Mii, appear as playable music that play on the Find Mii stage in Super Smash Bros. for Nintendo 3DS and on the Miiverse stage in Super Smash Bros. for Wii U. Both the stage and music return in Super Smash Bros. Ultimate and new theme track music called Find Mii / Find Mii II Medley (Streetpass Quest / Streetpass Quest II Medley).

Paid games (DLC)
On 18 June 2013 in Japan and Europe and 12 July 2013 in North America, the first major update to the StreetPass Mii Plaza added four new games, which could be purchased and added to the Mii Plaza. In the new games, players can earn Plaza Tickets that can be exchanged for hats and accessories. Two additional titles, StreetPass Fishing and StreetPass Zombies, were released in April 2015.

On 16 April 2015 a second major update (4.0) added two new games, such as new music.

A third major update (5.0) in September 2016 introduced five new purchasable games: StreetPass Slot Racing, StreetPass Trader, StreetPass Chef, StreetPass Explorers and StreetPass Ninja. One of the former two can be downloaded for free. These games were designed to be quick to play; Plaza Tickets, hats and accessories are not available through them.

StreetPass Squad / Mii Force
, known in North America as Mii Force, is a side-scrolling shoot 'em up game developed by Good-Feel. The game revolves around the Mii Force, led by the player, as they battle against the evil Gold Bone Gang. Players traverse each level blasting through enemies and recovering Miis encountered on StreetPass, who each provide unique weaponry based on their color. Miis are arranged on a grid of three forward facing weapons and one rear weapon, which can be rotated to shoot in multiple directions, with additional Miis powering up the main weapons when placed behind them on the grid. If the player is hit, one of the Miis will be forced to retreat, and the game ends if the player loses all of their Miis. After completing the main campaign, players unlock Arcade mode, which tasks players with clearing the campaign on one run. The game also features leaderboards, encouraging players to beat scores set by people encountered on StreetPass.

StreetPass Garden / Flower Town
, known in North America as Flower Town, is a gardening game developed by Grezzo. The game is loosely based on Mendelian genetics, in which players grow various types of plants, aiming to become a Master Gardener by growing twenty unique breeds of plants. Growing plants are watered by visiting Miis encountered on StreetPass. After a flower has bloomed, players can receive new seeds by breeding their plant with plants of other Miis. Flowers can be arranged in several gardens where the player may take screenshots that are saved to the Nintendo 3DS Camera. Flowers and unwanted seeds can be sold for money, which can be spent on new accessories, seeds, and plots. Job quests are available where the player is tasked with growing plants of specific qualities to fulfill customer requirements.

StreetPass Battle / Warrior's Way
, known in North America as Warrior's Way, is a battle simulation game developed by Spike Chunsoft. Players assume the role of a general on a quest to conquer the world one country at a time. Players amass armies either by encountering other players on StreetPass or using Play Coins to recruit mercenaries, before taking on the leaders of each country. Battles follow a rock, paper, scissors mechanic, in which players assign soldiers to three classes, with each have strengths and weaknesses against the other classes, and pit them against the opponent, the first to win two matches winning the battle and earning a portion of their soldiers. Defeating certain leaders earns materials which can be used to upgrade the player's castle, granting new options. Players encountered on StreetPass will be monarchs if they have StreetPass Battle. The player may choose to greet the monarch peacefully or challenge them to a battle in order to earn more soldiers.

StreetPass Mansion / Monster Manor
, known in North America as Monster Manor, is a puzzle RPG developed by Prope. Taking place in a haunted mansion, players create rooms by laying out map pieces given to them by StreetPass-encountered players. Laying pieces of the same color together expands the room, sometimes revealing treasure chests that offer new weapons and items. The main task is to uncover the stairs to the next floor in order to progress. When entering a new room, the player may encounter an enemy, which they must face against using their equipped weapon, which uses rechargeable batteries to function. During battle, the player can either fire at the enemy, which uses one battery charge, or defend against the enemy's attack, which slowly drains the battery meter. Defeating enemies earns experience points which can power up the equipped weapon. There are various types of weapon, some of which are more effective against certain enemies. If the player runs out of health points, they will faint and their session will end.

StreetPass Fishing / Ultimate Angler
, known in North America as Ultimate Angler, is a simulation game developed by Prope. In this game, players use bait received from Miis encountered on StreetPass to try and catch various species of fish across several islands. Each type of fish have certain types of bait they are attracted to, and players can combine bait together in order to catch larger fish. Each island is split up into multiple areas, which are unlocked after players manage to catch a certain type of fish. In addition to the five main islands players can fish across, additional islands can be accessed by encountering Miis from different regions and countries. Catching fish and clearing challenges earns money that can be used to upgrade various fishing rods that they receive during the game, or purchase and upgrade aquariums used to store fish caught during each session, which can be shared with people encountered on StreetPass.

StreetPass Zombies / Battleground Z
, known in North America as Battleground Z, is an action game developed by Good-Feel. The game tasks players with battling against hordes of zombies in order to clear each level's objective. Miis that are encountered via StreetPass can be found across each level, each carrying a unique weapon such as a Wii Remote, a bowling ball, and a paintbrush, which each have a limited number of chargeable special attacks. Players receive these weapons by encountering each Mii, with some Miis offering to team up and fight alongside the player. If the player takes too much damage, they will lose their current weapon, and the level ends if the player loses all of their weapons or fail the main objective (the player has three chances to attempt each level per session). Clearing various criteria, such as beating a level within a time limit, earns medals, with additional levels unlocked after obtaining enough medals.

StreetPass Slot Racer / Slot Car Rivals
StreetPass Slot Racer, known in North America as Slot Car Rivals, is a racing game developed by Good-Feel. StreetPass Slot Racer involves the player racing up to 10 other players along a selection of courses. As different achievements are gained, the number of courses available increases and "special" cars become available. Standard cars are customisable, but none of the special cars are. The game completes when the player beats the world champion (although a faster time is available to play against after this).

StreetPass Trader / Market Crashers
StreetPass Trader, known in North America as Market Crashers, is a business simulation game developed by Good-Feel. This game is based on a stock buying and selling game, and features various companies (all based on other StreetPass Mii Plaza games, for example "conqueror construction" inspired by StreetPass Battle/Warrior's Way.) The stocks become more volatile the further the player progresses, but there are also purchasing opportunities and achievements available.

StreetPass Chef / Feed Mii
StreetPass Chef, known in North America as Feed Mii, is a cookery simulation game developed by Prope. It is based in the same world as StreetPass Quest/Find Mii although has no effect on gameplay in the game. The concept involves cooking required dishes with 10 ingredients (which can be purchased with play coins or supplied by StreetPassed Miis). Selecting the right ingredients leads to higher points and so the Miis make more progress in the quest adventure.

StreetPass Explorers / Mii Trek
StreetPass Explorers, known in North America as Mii Trek, is an adventure game developed by Arzest. This game is based on players traveling through a jungle on a quest to find artifacts and to document animals. Throughout the play session, explorers can become lost. The session stops when no more explorers remain.

StreetPass Ninja / Ninja Launcher
StreetPass Ninja, known in North America as Ninja Launcher, is a shooter game developed by Prope. The game involves your character being shot out of a cannon in order to defeat enemies. Your character for the play session is weaponless, unless they can grab armament scrolls dangling from kites.

References

2011 video games
Nintendo games
Good-Feel games
Nintendo 3DS-only games
Nintendo Network
Role-playing video games
Video games developed in Japan
Video games with downloadable content
Nintendo 3DS games